Iuliu Szöcs (23 December 1937 – 29 August 1992) was a Romanian volleyball player. He competed in the men's tournament at the 1964 Summer Olympics.

References

External links
 

1937 births
1992 deaths
People from Mureș County
Romanian men's volleyball players
Olympic volleyball players of Romania
Volleyball players at the 1964 Summer Olympics